Eleanor Morton is a Scottish comedian, actor, and writer.

Career 
Morton studied English and Scottish Literature at the University of Glasgow and screenwriting at the Met Film School. Morton did stand-up comedy while at university; her first gig was in 2010 and in 2013 she reached the semi-finals of the Chortle Student Award. When Morton performed at the Glasgow Comedy Festival the following year, she was picked as one of The List's 'up-and-coming female comedians'. Morton made her Edinburgh Fringe debut in 2014 with her show titled 'Lollipop'.

During Covid lockdowns, Morton began creating videos in the character of Craig, a jaded guide giving tours around cultural sites such as a whisky distillery. The viral videos resulted in "a wave of new fans", and she was "one of the comedians to come out of lockdown with their reputation enhanced". Morton's 2022 show, 'Eleanor Morton Has Peaked', drew on her experiences of lockdown. She is a board member of The Alternative Comedy Memorial Society, and co-hosted their 2021 Edinburgh Fringe show.

Morton co-wrote and co-starred in The Rest of Us with Mary Flanigan and Esyllt Sears. The show was broadcast on BBC Radio 4 in 2022 and was about marginalised figures in British history.

Stand up shows 

 Lollipop (2014)
 Allotted Mucking Around Time (2015)
 Happy Birthday Katie Lewis! (2016)
 Angry Young Woman (2017)
 Great Title, Glamorous Photo (2018)
 Post-Morton (2019)
 Eleanor Morton Has Peaked (2022)

References

External links
 
 
 

Scottish people
Living people
Alumni of the University of Glasgow
Scottish comedians
Scottish women comedians
Scottish writers
Year of birth missing (living people)